Rodrigo Silva may refer to:

 Rodrigo Augusto da Silva (1833-1889), Brazilian politician, diplomat and lawyer
 Rodrigo Silva (footballer, born 1982), Brazilian football forward
 Rodrigo Silva (footballer, born 1987), East Timorese football attacking midfielder
 Rodrigo da Silva (footballer) (born 1988), Brazilian football forward
 Rodrigo Silva (rugby union) (born 1992), Uruguayan rugby union player